Going Hollywood is a 1933 American pre-Code musical film directed by Raoul Walsh and starring Marion Davies and Bing Crosby. It was written by Donald Ogden Stewart and based on a story by Frances Marion.  Going Hollywood was released by Metro-Goldwyn-Mayer on December 22, 1933.

Plot
The film tells how an infatuated school-teacher, Sylvia Bruce (Marion Davies), follows Bill Williams (Bing Crosby), a popular crooner, to Hollywood where he is to make a picture. On board the train she obtains a job as maid to Bill's French fiancée and leading lady, Lili Yvonne (Fifi D'Orsay), and meets the film's director, Conroy (Ned Sparks), and promoter, Baker (Stuart Erwin). On arrival in Hollywood she is befriended by Jill (Patsy Kelly) and shares her rooms.

At the Independent Art Studio in Hollywood, where the film is being made, Lili's temperament and lack of talent cause Conroy much concern. Eventually, after losing her temper with a woman who asks for her autograph, Lili refuses to continue unless the woman is removed from the Studio. She is persuaded to stay and production continues with her singing 'Cinderella's Fella' but Conroy is still not satisfied and an angry Lili walks out. Sylvia impersonates Lili's version of the song and ends with an imitation of Lili's tantrums. Lili returns in time to hear Sylvia and there is a brawl in which Lili gets a black eye. Baker, who has also heard Sylvia, intervenes by firing Lili and engaging Sylvia for the part.

Baker asks Sylvia to accompany him to a party but withdraws when Bill expresses his own interest in her. Bill takes Sylvia to dinner and the party but a quarrel ensues and she accuses him of insincerity. Bill deserts the film and goes with Lili to Tijuana where, drinking heavily, he receives a telephone call from the Studio with the ultimatum that if he does not return they will get a replacement. Lili advises him to let them do so and suggests that they fly together to New York and on to Paris. Sylvia finds him and pleads for him to come back to the Studio but returns without him.

In Hollywood there is difficulty with the player chosen to replace Bill and eventually Bill finally appears at the Studio to rejoin Sylvia in the film's closing sequence to sing 'Our Big Love Scene'.

The song 'Beautiful Girl' is sung by Crosby at the beginning of the film before his departure for Hollywood when technicians arrive to record it. When he boards the train at Grand Central Terminal there is a big production number where he and the chorus sing 'Going Hollywood'. He also sings a few lines of 'Just an Echo in the Valley'. Crosby is also heard singing 'Our Big Love Scene' on the radio when Jill is showing Sylvia her apartment. 'We'll Make Hay While the Sun Shines' is a dream-sequence production number with thunderstorm effects at the Studio and is featured by Crosby, Marion Davies, chorus and dancers. An impersonation act by The Radio Rogues is also filmed at the Studio and includes imitations of Kate Smith ('When The Moon Comes Over The Mountain'). Russ Columbo ('You Call It Madness But I Call It Love'), Morton Downey ('Remember Me?') and Rudy Vallee ('My Dime Is Your Dime'). Crosby sings 'After Sundown' at the party. 'Temptation' was an early film attempt to fit a song into the story pattern and was presented dramatically by Crosby whilst drinking tequila in a bar at Tijuana.

Cast
 Marion Davies as Sylvia Bruce
 Bing Crosby as Bill 'Billy' Williams
 Fifi D'Orsay as Lili Yvonne
 Stuart Erwin as Ernest Pratt Baker, Picture Producer
 Ned Sparks as Mr. Bert Conroy, Director
 Patsy Kelly as Jill Barker
 Bobby Watson as Jack Thompson, the Press Agent
 Sam McDaniel as Rasputin the Train Porter
 Three Radio Rogues as Group Performing Imitations
 Eddie Bartell as Radio Rogue
 Jimmy Hollywood as Radio Rogue
 Henry Taylor as Radio Rogue

Soundtrack
 "Going Hollywood" (Nacio Herb Brown / Arthur Freed) by Bing Crosby at the railroad station
 "Our Big Love Scene" (Nacio Herb Brown / Arthur Freed) by Bing Crosby
 "Beautiful Girl" (Nacio Herb Brown / Arthur Freed) by Bing Crosby
 "Just an Echo in the Valley" (Harry M. Woods / Jimmy Campbell / Reg Connelly) by Bing Crosby
 "We'll Make Hay While the Sun Shines" (Nacio Herb Brown / Arthur Freed) by Bing Crosby and Marion Davies and chorus
 "Cinderella's Fella" (Nacio Herb Brown / Arthur Freed) by Fifi D'Orsay, reprised by Marion Davies
 "Happy Days Are Here Again"
 "When the Moon Comes over the Mountain" by Jimmy Hollywood imitating Kate Smith
 "You Call It Madness (But I Call It Love)" (Russ Columbo / Con Conrad / Gladys Dubois / Paul Gregory) by Henry Taylor imitating Russ Columbo
 "Remember Me" (Jack O'Brien / Gus Kahn) by Jimmy Hollywood imitating Morton Downey
 "My Time Is Your Time" (Eric Little / Leo Dance) by Jimmy Hollywood imitating Rudy Vallée
 "After Sundown" (Nacio Herb Brown / Arthur Freed) by Bing Crosby
 "Temptation" (Nacio Herb Brown / Arthur Freed) by Bing Crosby

Crosby recorded some of the songs for Brunswick Records and "Temptation", "We'll Make Hay While the Sun Shines" and "Beautiful Girl" reached the charts of the day peaking at Nos. 3, 8 and 11 respectively.

Release
Going Hollywood was released on home video in May 1993.  Warner released it on DVD in July 2013.

Reception
The New York Times welcomed the film. "Blended properly with the holiday humors, Going Hollywood has enough basic liveliness to produce a sprightly and jocular mood at the Capitol. The overwhelming magnitude of the latter-day musical picture is gratefully absent from this one. It is warm, modest and good-humored. Bing Crosby has a manner and a voice, both pleasant, and the songs that Nacio Brown and Arthur Freed provide have a tinkle and a lilt. From the competent routine sentiments of “Our Big Love Scene” and the pleasing little pastoral lyric “We’ll Make Love When It Rains” they range down to that brooding song which Mr. Crosby, loaded with whisky and sorrow, sings across a Mexican bar while the glamorous Miss Davies is far away.
Variety's reaction was mixed as they commented: "Pretentious musical with class in every department but one. It has names, girls and good music, but its story is weak from hunger and the script will prevent a big click. Fair is its rating...Marion Davies is starred and Bing Crosby featured, but Crosby will draw the bulk of what this one gets. Other assets are the music, the fact that it’s good, and that it has girls and plenty of them . . .  From start to finish Crosby is constantly singing. It must be good singing because it doesn’t get tiresome, despite that it's laid on so heavy. . . .  At least three songs in the generally excellent score, as played by Lennie Hayton’s orchestra, sound promising. With Crosby there to sing ‘em the songs get a break, too.

TV Guide called it "fluffy fun" with a "literate and amusing screenplay".  A reviewer on Turner Classic Movies praised Crosby's singing and said that his voice never falters.  Jamie S. Rich of DVD Talk rated it 3.5/5 stars and wrote, "Going Hollywood is almost the perfect Hollywood movie musical cliché."

Box office
The film grossed a total (domestic and foreign) of $962,000: $620,000 from the U.S. and $342,000 elsewhere resulting in a loss of $269,000.

Radio adaptation
Going Hollywood was presented on Musical Comedy Theater December 10, 1952. The one-hour adaptation starred Denise Darcel, Andy Russell, and Mary McCarty.

References

External links
 
 
 
 

1933 films
1933 musical comedy films
1933 romantic comedy films
American musical comedy films
American romantic comedy films
American romantic musical films
American black-and-white films
Metro-Goldwyn-Mayer films
Films directed by Raoul Walsh
Films produced by Walter Wanger
Films scored by Lennie Hayton
Films with screenplays by Donald Ogden Stewart
Films about filmmaking
1930s English-language films
1930s American films